KGGF (690 kHz) is a commercial AM radio station in Coffeyville, Kansas.  It airs a talk radio format and is owned by Sek Media, LLC.  The studios and offices are on West 8th Street in Coffeyville.

KGGF has a daytime power of 10,000 watts, covering parts of Kansas, Oklahoma, Missouri and Arkansas.  AM 690 is a Canadian and Mexican clear channel frequency.  So at night, to reduce interference to other stations, KGGF reduces power to 5,000 watts. A directional antenna is used at all times.  The transmitter is a Harris DX-10 installed in 1997.  KGGF uses a two-tower array by day and a four-tower array at night, located off Clay Road.

Programming
KGGF features local news, farm reports and talk shows on weekdays, with nationally syndicated conservative talk hosts afternoons and nights.  Hosts include Sean Hannity, Dave Ramsey, Todd Starnes, Hugh Hewitt and Coast to Coast AM with George Noory overnight.

Weekends feature shows about gardening, the outdoors, technology and old time radio shows.  Weekend hosts include Chris Plante, Ben Shapiro and Somewhere in Time with Art Bell.  World and national news is supplied by Fox News Radio.

History
In 1930, KGGF first signed on the air.  It was powered at 1,000 watts and had to share time on the air on its original frequency of 1010 kilocycles.

On March 18, 1932, the Federal Radio Commission authorized moving the KGGF studios from South Coffeyville, Oklahoma, to Coffeyville, Kansas.  The studios were at the corner of 8th and Elm Streets.  The owner was Hugh J. Powell.

In the 1930s, 1010 kHz was a regional channel.  The station later got a boost to 5,000 watts maximum and 500 watts minimum.  In 1941, with the enactment of North American Regional Broadcasting Agreement (NARBA), KGGF was reassigned to 690 kHz, a Canadian clear channel frequency.  It was authorized to run 50,000 watts maximum and 250 watts minimum, provided the station was 650 miles, or more, from the Canada–US border. Simultaneously, 1010 became a new Canadian clear channel frequency, assigned to Calgary while 690 was assigned to Montreal and later to Tijuana, Mexico.

In October 1947, the Federal Communications Commission approved the sale of KGGF from Hugh J. Powell to The Midwest Broadcasting Company for $400,000.
 
In 1983, an FM station was added at 98.9 MHz.  In 1991, Mahaffey Enterprises acquired KGGF-AM-FM for $750,000.

References

External links
KGGF-AM's website (within www.kggfradio.com)

GGF (AM)
News and talk radio stations in the United States
Radio stations established in 1930